Paul Reinsch may refer to:

 Paul Samuel Reinsch (1869–1923), American political scientist and diplomat
 Paul Friedrich Reinsch (1836–1914), German phycologist and paleontologist